Dunalley may refer to:

Baron Dunalley, of Kilboy in the County of Tipperary, is a title in the Peerage of Ireland
Henry Prittie, 1st Baron Dunalley (1743–1801), Irish peer and Member of Parliament
Henry Prittie, 2nd Baron Dunalley (1775–1854), Anglo-Irish politician
Henry Prittie, 4th Baron Dunalley (1851–1927), Anglo-Irish peer
Dunalley, Tasmania